Georg Max Trexler (1903 in Pirna – 1979 in Leipzig) was a German composer.

Originally a student of economics at the University of Leipzig, he switched to music under the influence of Karl Straube, and became a choirmaster and organist at the St. Trinitatis church in Leipzig in 1930, continuing his work there for forty years.

He started teaching organ and conducting at the conservatory in 1935; he was drafted as a soldier in 1940, and ended the war as a US prisoner of war, before returning to Leipzig and the university.

Pope Paul VI awarded him the Order of St. Sylvester in 1967 for his contributions to Catholic music.

External links 

 

1903 births
1979 deaths
Kirchenmusikdirektor
People from Pirna
People from the Kingdom of Saxony
20th-century German composers